The Delaware Fightin' Blue Hens women's basketball team is the basketball team that represents University of Delaware in Newark, Delaware. The school's team currently competes in the Colonial Athletic Association.

History
Delaware began play in 1971. In the 2011–12 and 2012–13 seasons, they went undefeated in CAA play, going 18–0 twice. They won their first ever NCAA Tournament game in 2012, beating Little Rock 73–42 before losing in the ensuing round to Kansas 70–64. They made the regional semifinals in the 2013 NCAA Division I women's basketball tournament after beating West Virginia 66–53 and North Carolina 78–69 before losing to Kentucky 69–62. Elena Delle Donne played for the Blue Hens from 2009 to 2013, scoring 3,039 points, good for 9th in the all-time list. As of the end of the 2020–21 season, the Fightin' Blue Hens have an all-time record of 820–552.

Historic results

Season by season

Susan Occhi was only the coach for one season, 1969 to 1970, however all of the games were played in 1970, and she remained coach until being replaced by Mary Ann Hitchens. See also Note B.
Mary Ann Hitchens began as the coach during the 1970 to 1971 school year, however, all of the games for that school year were played in 1971. She had been the 1969-70 freshman team coach and moved up to coach varsity at the beginning of 1971, for the 1970–1971 school year. See also Note A.

NCAA tournament
The Blue Hens have appeared in the NCAA tournament five times, with their 2013 Sweet Sixteen appearance being their best showing.

WNIT tournament
The Blue Hens have appeared in the WNIT Tournament nine times, with their 2021 semifinal appearance and Charlotte Regional Championship being their best.

The 2006 Women's National Invitation Tournament expanded from 32 to 40 teams, adding an additional round of games. The 2007 tournament expanded to 48 teams, eliminating first round byes, and the tournament was expanded to 64 teams in 2010.

The 2021 Women's National Invitation Tournament contracted from 64 to 32 teams, eliminating one round of the tournament.

See also
Delaware Fightin' Blue Hens men's basketball

References

External links